Kick4Life FC (K4L) is the world's first football club exclusively dedicated to social change. Currently playing in the Lesotho Men's Premier League and the Lesotho Women's Super League the club is a registered charity in Lesotho, the UK and the US, and aims to utilise the power of football to change the lives and long-term prospects of young people in Lesotho.

History

Kick4Life FC is a football club based in Lesotho. Based in Maseru, the club’s mission is to transform the lives and long-term prospects of vulnerable young people in Lesotho, through a wide range of Football for Good activities focused on health, education, gender equality and employability.

Kick4Life was founded as a charity in 2005 by brothers Steve Fleming and Pete Fleming from the UK. A men’s team was founded in 2008 and a women’s team in 2009. The men’s team became champions of the Northern Stream A-Division League in 2013/14 and was promoted to the Lesotho Premier League, since maintaining its top flight status. The women’s team became founding members of the Lesotho Women’s Super League in 2015, winning the Super League Cup in 2018 and becoming national Super League Champions in 2021.

In June 2020 Kick4Life FC became the first top flight football club in the world to commit to gender equal budgets and pay.

Social Development

Kick4Life delivers a range of social interventions around health education, gender equality, employability and life-skills development including Girls United, Good Health & Wellbeing through Sport and the Kick4Life Academy, which provides vulnerable children & young people with intensive academic support, football coaching and character development. In 2007 Kick4Life pioneered the Test Your Team model which featured football tournaments with integrated health education and voluntary HIV testing and counselling.

Kick4Life’s social programmes have been recognised with the following awards and nominations:

•	Best Implementing Project for HIV/AIDS by the National AIDS Commission, 2008

•	Best Project for Health, Score4Africa Awards, 2009

•	Beyond Sport Award for Health, 2010 

•	Global Sport Forum Community Award, 2011

•	Nelson Mandela Children's Fund, Best Practice Award

•	Stars Foundation Rising Star Award, 2013

•	Network Board Members of streetfootballworld, 2013-2015

Social Enterprise

Kick4Life runs a number of social enterprises at its centre in Maseru designed to generate income for its Football for Good programmes as well as providing job and training opportunities for young people. The enterprises include No.7 Restaurant and Hokahanya Inn and Conference Centre, both opened in 2014.

Kick4Life Assist
Kick4Life Assist is a training and development service through which Kick4Life has supported Sport for Good projects around the world with curriculum development, coach training and strategy development. This includes developing the Kick for trade Curriculum in partnership with the International Trade Centre and UEFA Foundation for Children.

Eleven: Stories of Development through Football
Eleven is a book written and published in 2010 by Kick4Life Co-founder Steve Fleming, with foreword by England national football team coach, Fabio Capello. The book tells the true stories of eleven individuals – the number of people in a football team – and their struggles with poverty, war and disease, and how ultimately, football has helped to change their lives. The book was published by Pitch Publishing and nominated for the Peace & Sport Special Jury Prize 2011.

References

External links

Football in the United Kingdom
Health charities in the United Kingdom
Foreign charities operating in Lesotho